Two ships of the United States Navy have been named "Semmes", in honor of Commander (USN), Rear Admiral (CSN), Brigadier General (CSA) Raphael Semmes

She was reclassified as AG-24 in 1935.
 ,  guided missile destroyer, commissioned in 1962 and decommissioned in 1991.

United States Navy ship names